Islamabad is located at  at the edge of the Pothohar Plateau at the foot of the Margalla Hills in Islamabad Capital Territory. The modern capital and the ancient Gakhar city of Rawalpindi stand side by side and are commonly referred to as the Twin Cities. To the east of the city lies Murree and Kotli Sattian. To the north lies the Haripur District of Khyber Pakhtunkhwa. Kahuta lies on the northeast, Taxila, Wah Cantt, and Attock District to the northwest, Gujar Khan, Kallar Syedan, Rawat, and Mandrah on the northeast, and Rawalpindi to the southwest.

Tilla Charouni with 1604 meter/ 5263 feet is the highest point in Islamabad district.

A further  area is known as the Specified Area, with the Margala Hills in the north and northeast. The southern portion of the city is an undulating plain. It is drained by the Kurang River, on which the Rawal Dam is located. Islamabad's micro-climate is regulated by three artificial reservoirs; Rawal, Simli, and Khanpur Dam.

Climate

Places

References

 
Islamabad